RPGRIP1L is a human gene.

Function

The protein encoded by this gene is localized to primary cilia and centrosomes in ciliated human epithelial kidney cells and retinal pigment epithelial cells . RPGRIP1L colocalized at the basal body-centrosome complex with the proteins NPHP4, NPHP6, and TUBG1.
Also, it can interact with MyosinVa

Clinical significance

Mutations in the RPGRIP1L gene are associated with Joubert syndrome and Meckel syndrome which belong to a group of developmental autosomal recessive disorders that are associated with cilium dysfunction. Mutations in this gene are also associated with nephronophthisis. Copy number variation affecting the gene was associated with schizophrenia in one study.

A genetic variation within the RPGRIP1L gene, rs3213758, is associated with increased BMI. Genetic variations strongly associated with obesity within the FTO gene have also been implicated in the control of RPGRIP1L expression. Mice with decreased expression of RPGRIP1L are fatter, eat more, have diminished sensitivity to the hormone leptin that normally reduces food intake, and display altered morphology of the brain center that regulates feeding. Similarly, cells derived from Joubert patients with RPGRIP1L mutations have decreased leptin sensitivity, and neurons important for food intake segregating for obesity-risk variations at the FTO locus have decreased RPGRIP1L expression and diminished outgrowth. These studies suggest that RPGRIP1L is a gene important in human obesity.

References